Drake Steven Callender (born October 7, 1997) is an American professional soccer player who plays as a goalkeeper for Major League Soccer club Inter Miami.

Early life
Callender played youth soccer with Cap FC United and Placer United, before going on to be part of the San Jose Earthquakes academy from 2013 to 2016.

In 2016, Callendar began playing college soccer for the California Golden Bears. In four seasons, Callender made 54 appearances, keeping 16 clean sheets. He was named to the United Soccer Coaches NCAA All-Far West Region First Team and the All-Pac-12 First Team for the 2017 season. For the 2018 season, he was named to the preseason MAC Hermann Trophy Watch List and earned United Soccer Coaches NCAA All-Far West Region Third Team and All-Pac-12 Second Team honors.

While in college, Callender spent time with USL League Two side San Francisco Glens, but didn't appear for the team during the 2019 season.

Career
On November 12, 2019, Inter Miami acquired Callender's homegrown player rights from San Jose Earthquakes in exchange for the 27th draft pick in the 2020 MLS SuperDraft, and potentially up to $150,000 in General Allocation Money if Callender meets certain performance-based metrics. He joined the club's roster ahead of their inaugural Major League Soccer season in 2020.

Callender made his professional debut on May 7, 2021, starting for Inter Miami affiliate Fort Lauderdale CF against Union Omaha in USL League One. Callendar made six saves during Inter Miami's 2023 season-opening victory over CF Montréal, earning him a spot in the league's Team of the Matchday for week one.

Career statistics

Club

References

External links

 

1997 births
Living people
American soccer players
Association football goalkeepers
California Golden Bears men's soccer players
Inter Miami CF II players
Homegrown Players (MLS)
Inter Miami CF players
San Francisco Glens players
Soccer players from Sacramento, California
USL League One players
Major League Soccer players